Chinanu Michael Onuaku (born November 1, 1996) is an American professional basketball player for Hapoel Tel Aviv of the Israeli Basketball Premier League. He played college basketball for the Louisville Cardinals. In 2021-22, he led the Israeli Basketball Premier League in rebounds per game.

High school career
Onuaku attended Riverdale Baptist School where he averaged 12.4 points, 12.7 rebounds, and 5.5 blocks as a senior, leading Riverdale to a 30–9 record and the Capital Beltway conference title.

When Onuaku graduated, he was considered the 74th best prospect by Rivals.com, 75th by ESPN and was rated as the seventh-best center in the nation by Scout.com.

College career
Onuaku played two seasons of college basketball for the University of Louisville between 2014 and 2016. In his sophomore season, he averaged 9.9 points, 8.5 rebounds and 2.0 blocks, earning All-ACC Defensive Team and All-ACC honorable mention honors and posting 11 double-doubles.

In May 2016, Onuaku announced he would enter the NBA draft.

Professional career

Houston Rockets (2016–2018)
On June 23, 2016, Onuaku was selected by the Houston Rockets with the 37th overall pick in the 2016 NBA draft and later joined them for the 2016 NBA Summer League. On July 20, 2016, he signed with the Rockets. He made his NBA debut on December 26, 2016, coming on in the fourth quarter and recording six points and three rebounds in a 131–115 win over the Phoenix Suns. He hit a pair of free throws in the game with his underhanded free-throw action. During his rookie season, Onuaku had multiple assignments with the Rio Grande Valley Vipers, the Rockets' D-League affiliate. On May 1, 2017, he was suspended two games without pay for pushing a game official. The incident occurred during an altercation in the final seconds of the Vipers' 122–96 loss to Raptors 905 in Game 3 of the 2017 NBA D-League Finals on April 27.

On August 2, 2018, Onuaku was traded from the Rockets to the Dallas Mavericks for the rights to forward Maarty Leunen. He was waived four days later.

On September 4, 2018, Onuaku signed with the Portland Trail Blazers. On October 13, 2018, he was waived by the Trail Blazers.

Greensboro Swarm (2018–2019)
On October 20, 2018, Onuaku was selected with the second overall pick in the 2018 NBA G League draft by the Greensboro Swarm.

Wonju DB Promy (2019–2020)
Onuaku spent the 2019-20 season in South Korea with Wonju DB Promy. He averaged 14.4 points, 10.3 rebounds, 2.5 assists, 1.4 steals and 1.5 blocks per game.

Zadar (2020–2021)
On October 14, 2020, Onuaku signed with Zadar in the Croatian League.

Bnei Herzliya (2021–2022)
On July 21, 2021, he signed with Bnei Herzliya of the Israeli Basketball Premier League. On February 17, 2022, Onuaku won the Israeli Basketball State Cup after Bnei Herzliya Basket edged out Hapoel Tel Aviv 87-82. Onuaku was crowned as the game's MVP with 30 points, 17 rebounds, 4 assists, 4 blocks and a 50 PIR. For the 2021-22 season, he led the league in rebound average, averaging 9.9 per game.

Dinamo Sassari (2022)
On July 20, 2022, he signed with Dinamo Sassari of the Italian Lega Basket Serie A (LBA).

Hapoel Tel Aviv (2022–present) 
On November 13, 2022, he signed with Hapoel Tel Aviv of the Israeli Basketball Premier League.

NBA career statistics

Regular season

|-
| style="text-align:left;"| 
| style="text-align:left;"| Houston
| 5 || 1 || 10.4 || .714 || - || 1.000 || 2.0 || .6 || .6 || .2 || 2.8
|-
| style="text-align:left;"| 
| style="text-align:left;"| Houston
| 1 || 0 || 22.0 || .400 || - || - || 4.0 || 1.0 || .0 || .0 || 4.0
|-
| style="text-align:center;" colspan="2"| Career
| 6 || 1 || 12.3 || .583 || - || 1.000 || 2.3 || .7 || .5 || .2 || 3.0

Playoffs

|-
| style="text-align:left;"| 2018
| style="text-align:left;"| Houston
| 1 || 0 || 3.0 || - || - || - || 1.0 || 1.0 || 1.0 || .0 || .0
|-
| style="text-align:center;" colspan="2"| Career
| 1 || 0 || 3.0 || - || - || - || 1.0 || 1.0 || 1.0 || .0 || .0

Personal life
Onuaku is the son of Nwaneka and Christopher Onuaku, and has three older siblings: Ify, Arinze and Chuk. Onuaku's brother, Arinze, is also a professional basketball player. In 2020, Onuaku began dating Mone Hicks. Their daughter Chloe Onuaku was born in March 2022.

References

External links
Louisville Cardinals bio

1996 births
Living people
21st-century African-American sportspeople
African-American basketball players
American men's basketball players
American sportspeople of Nigerian descent
Basketball players from Maryland
Bnei Hertzeliya basketball players
Centers (basketball)
Dinamo Sassari players
Greensboro Swarm players
Houston Rockets draft picks
Houston Rockets players
KK Zadar players
Louisville Cardinals men's basketball players
People from Lanham, Maryland
Power forwards (basketball)
Rio Grande Valley Vipers players
Sportspeople from the Washington metropolitan area
United States men's national basketball team players